José de Armas and Fernando González were the defending champions, but only de Armas competed this year with Daniel Langre. They lost in the quarterfinals to Irakli Labadze and Lovro Zovko.

Labadze and Zovko ended up winning the title, defeating Kristian Pless and Olivier Rochus in the final, 6–1, 7–6.

Draw

Finals

Top half

Bottom half

External links
Main Draw

Boys' Doubles
1999